Les Résultats du féminisme (The Consequences of Feminism) is a 1906 French silent comedy film directed by Alice Guy. It was remade in 1912 as In the Year 2000.

Plot 
A society where the roles of men and women have been inverted. Slightly effeminate men sew, iron and take care of the children, while macho women drink and read newspapers in cafés, and court men.

References

External links 
 

1906 films
French silent short films
French black-and-white films
1906 comedy films
French comedy short films
French feminist films
Matriarchy
Silent comedy films
1900s French films